Kim Min-soo or Kim Min-su may refer to:
 Kim Min-soo (footballer, born 1984): South Korean football player
 Kim Min-soo (judoka): (born 1975), South Korean judoka, mixed martial artist and kickboxer
 Kim Min-soo (born 1977): South Korean composer Don Spike
 Kim Min-soo (basketball): (born 1982), South Korean basketball player with the Seoul SK Knights
 Kim Min-soo (beauty pageant winner): (born 1995), Miss South Korea 2018
 Kim Min-su (footballer, born 1997): South Korean football player